New Salisbury is an unincorporated community in Columbiana County, in the U.S. state of Ohio.

History
A post office called New Salisbury was established in 1855, and remained in operation until 1910. New Salisbury was located on the Cleveland and Pittsburgh Railroad.

References

Unincorporated communities in Columbiana County, Ohio
1855 establishments in Ohio
Populated places established in 1855
Unincorporated communities in Ohio